The National Hispanic University (NHU)  was a small, private university located in San Jose, California, founded by Stanford-educated Dr. B. Roberto Cruz. National Hispanic University ceased operations on August 23, 2015. It was the first four-year Latino university in the United States. NHU's vision was to foster "a caring learning environment where students have felt valued and supported at every step in their academic journey. Embracing diversity and multiple perspectives as guiding principles."

History
The National Hispanic University was founded in 1981 in Oakland, California, to address the needs of Hispanic men and women. Founder Dr. Roberto Cruz had studied the disproportionately large impact historically black colleges and universities had in generating both undergraduate and professional degree graduates within the Black community. Dr. Cruz's vision was to have similarly positive impact on the Hispanic community in the United States. In 1990, the university opened a San Jose campus and moved to a larger facility in Oakland. In 1994, NHU closed both campuses and moved to a new campus in East San Jose.

For several years, National Hispanic University published an annual report card on Hispanic quality of life.

From 1981 to 1986, NHU also published reports on women of La Raza, Cesar Chavez, bilingual special education, Las Posadas, and "Steps to Humanity."

In the 2000s, NHU was unsuccessful in its many attempts to find financial backers from Silicon Valley or Latino philanthropists who could save the school.

After those options were closed, the school reached a deal with Laureate Education.

In 2010, NHU became a member of the Laureate International Universities network, a for-profit college chain. Laureate hoped to turn NHU into a mostly online school.

In 2012, NHU celebrated its 30th anniversary.

Laureate officially closed National Hispanic University on August 23, 2015.

Laureate's decision to close
When Laureate made the decision to abandon National Hispanic University in 2014, one NHU student remarked "The values of the school stood out for me."..."Now it comes down to dollar bills." According to the San Jose Mercury News, "some students who wanted a traditional, classroom approach to education said they felt abandoned by Laureate after NHU's drive to enroll thousands of new students in Internet classes did not produce the desired results."

Plans for NHU campus
As part of the Foundation for Hispanic Education's efforts, the East San Jose campus is planned to house The Center for Latino Education and Innovation, The Latino College Preparatory Academy (a bilingual charter school), and The Luis Valdez Leadership Academy, a charter high school for students in San José.

Accreditation
The university was accredited by WASC and was rated by the Carnegie Foundation for the Advancement of Teaching as a "Baccalaureate College", with an academic breadth rated as "Diverse Fields"

References

External links
National Hispanic University
Laureate International Universities

Universities and colleges in San Jose
Educational institutions established in 1981
Schools accredited by the Western Association of Schools and Colleges
Education in Oakland, California
1981 establishments in California
Educational institutions disestablished in 2015
Hispanic and Latino American organizations
Defunct private universities and colleges in California